Karin Kiefer Smith (born August 4, 1955, in Fürstenfeldbruck, Bavaria) is a retired female javelin thrower from the United States. She was born in Germany.  She is a three-time Olympian. Smith qualified for a fourth, the 1980 U.S. Olympic team, but was unable to compete due to the 1980 Summer Olympics boycott. She did however receive one of 461 Congressional Gold Medals created especially for the spurned athletes.

College
While at Cal Poly, she won the Broderick Award, (now the Honda Sports Award) as the nation's best female collegiate track and field competitor in 1982.

International competitions

References

 

1955 births
Living people
People from Fürstenfeldbruck (district)
Sportspeople from Upper Bavaria
Track and field athletes from California
American female javelin throwers
Olympic track and field athletes of the United States
Athletes (track and field) at the 1976 Summer Olympics
Athletes (track and field) at the 1984 Summer Olympics
Athletes (track and field) at the 1988 Summer Olympics
World Athletics Championships athletes for the United States
UCLA Bruins women's track and field athletes
Universiade medalists in athletics (track and field)
Congressional Gold Medal recipients
Goodwill Games medalists in athletics
Universiade silver medalists for the United States
Medalists at the 1981 Summer Universiade
Competitors at the 1990 Goodwill Games